a railway station in the city of Ashikaga, Tochigi, Japan, operated by the East Japan Railway Company (JR East).

Lines
Yamamae Station is served by the Ryōmō Line, and is located 42.7 km from the terminus of the line at Oyama Station.

Station layout
Yamamae Station has a single side platform and a single island platform connected to the station building by a footbridge.

Platforms

Surrounding area
Ashikaga Fujimidai Hospital

History
The station opened on 1 April 1897. With the privatization of JNR on 1 April 1987, the station came under the control of JR East.

Passenger statistics
In fiscal 2017, the station was used by an average of 873 passengers daily (boarding passengers only).

See also
 List of railway stations in Japan

References

External links
 
 JR East station information 

Stations of East Japan Railway Company
Railway stations in Tochigi Prefecture
Ryōmō Line
Railway stations in Japan opened in 1897
Ashikaga, Tochigi